The Louisville Grays were a professional baseball team that played in the National League for two seasons from 1876 to 1877. The franchise used Louisville Baseball Park as their home field. During their two seasons of existence, the team had a record of 65–61.

Players

References

External links
Franchise index at Baseball-Reference and Retrosheet

Major League Baseball all-time rosters
Louisville Grays, Roster